In nanotechnology, a megalibrary is an assembly of millions of nanostructures. Its contents vary by size, composition, and shape. A single megalibrary may contain more new inorganic materials than have been synthesized and characterized to date.

Design 
Megalibraries are typically stored on 2 cm x 2 cm chips, each holding millions of structures. They have been described as analogous to gene chips. The chips are prepared by using a cantilever-free lithography method to deposit the nanoreactors on the substrate. . Parallel polymer pen lithography can be combined with an ink spray-coating method to create pen arrays, where each pen has a different, but deliberately chosen quantity and composition of ink. The result can be transformed into spatially encoded nanoparticles in terms of composition and size.

Applications 
Megalibraries have identified catalysts for use in the clean energy, automotive and chemical industries.

References

External links 

 

Nanomaterials